Ham Jeong-uk (born 17 May 1985) is a South Korean rower. He competed in the men's single sculls event at the 2004 Summer Olympics.

References

1985 births
Living people
South Korean male rowers
Olympic rowers of South Korea
Rowers at the 2004 Summer Olympics
Place of birth missing (living people)
Asian Games medalists in rowing
Rowers at the 2006 Asian Games
Asian Games silver medalists for South Korea
Medalists at the 2006 Asian Games